Macheon-dong is a neighbourhood, dong of Songpa-gu, Seoul, South Korea.

Education
Schools located in Macheon-dong:
 Seoul Macheon Elementary School
 Seoul Namcheon Elementary School

Transportation 
 Macheon Station of

See also
Im Gyeong Eop
Namhansan
Administrative divisions of South Korea

References

External links
 Macheon 1-dong resident center website
 Songpa-gu map

Neighbourhoods of Songpa District